Loxahatchee is an unincorporated community in Palm Beach County, Florida, United States, located north of Wellington, and west and northwest of Royal Palm Beach,  approximately  west of West Palm Beach. Loxahatchee is also the name of the Post Office that serves this area, which is under the zip code of 33470.

The community took its name from the Loxahatchee River. Loxahatchee is located within the Indian Trails Improvement District and the Loxahatchee Groves Water Control District. Lion Country Safari, a drive-through safari park, is located in Loxahatchee.

The state of Florida approved the incorporation of part of Loxahatchee, as the Town of Loxahatchee Groves, in 2006, which became the 38th municipality in Palm Beach County. The main reason for incorporating was to protect the area from encroaching growth, and to preserve the rural character of the neighborhood.

Loxahatchee is perhaps the most rural area within proximity to West Palm Beach, with lot sizes ranging from 1-20 acres. Loxahatchee and the adjacent The Acreage are notable for loose land restrictions and the presence of native and exotic animals.  The Seminole Ridge Community High School serves the area.

Education
Elementary schools:
Acreage Pines Elementary School
Golden Groves Elementary School
Loxahatchee Groves Elementary School
Frontier Elementary School
Pierce Hammock Elementary School

Middle Schools:
Western Pines Middle School
Osceola Creek Middle School

High School:
Seminole Ridge Community High School

Notable residents
 Ángel Hernández (born 1961), baseball umpire
 Nick Rickles (born 1990), American-Israeli baseball player
 Ashley Mathews (born 1991), pornographic actress
 Robert Stempel (1933–2011), Chairman and CEO of General Motors
 Brooke Eden (born 1988), country singer

See also
The Acreage, Florida
Loxahatchee Groves, Florida

References

External links
Indian Trail Improvement District
Loxahatchee Groves Water Control District
Town of Loxahatchee Groves
Seminole Ridge Community High School Boundary Map – School District of Palm Beach County

Unincorporated communities in Palm Beach County, Florida
Unincorporated communities in Florida